Petar Nikolov-Zikov (or simply Petar Nikolov)  is a Bulgarian political scientist, historian and politician, Associate Professor in New Bulgarian University and Deputy Minister of Education and Science in the third cabinet of Boyko Borissov. He declares himself a conservative and advocate for the "three pillars of conservative politics" – Christianity, patriotism and capitalism. He is also critical of the legal framework of abortion and same-sex marriage.

Biography 
He was born on June 3, 1979 in the family of his father, the artist Nikolay Nikolov-Zikov and his mother, a doctor. In 1998 he graduated from the National School for Ancient Languages and Cultures; he then graduated as bachelor in political science at Sofia University (2002) and master of political management (2004). He has three daughters from his first marriage and a son from his second.

Professional career 
Since 1999 he has been publishing articles in popular right-wing newspapers such as Democracy, Pro and Anti and Seven. In 2000 he joined the analysis department of UDF. After the divide of UDF in 2004 Nikolov became head of the political section of Democrats for a Strong Bulgaria (DSB). From 2008 to 2009 he ran his own political TV show – "Thursday Club".

Petar Nikolov was awarded a PhD by New Bulgarian University (NBU) in 2010 and is assistant professor of Political science in NBU. Since 2019 he has been Associate Professor of Political science in NBU and he holds bachelor and master courses in programs of the departments “Political science”, “History” and others.

In 2011 he published his first book The Birth of Bulgarian conservatism; the year after he published The House of Sratsimir, which was then continued by his next historical monograph The True story of the Principality of Vidin. In 2017 Nikolov's fourth monograph, The Political Conservatism, came out of print, written in co-authorship with his colleague from NBU Dr. Irena Todorova.
From 2015 to 2017 Petar Nikolov is the editor-in-chief of the academic magazine Conservative Quarterly. In 2019 he published his fifth book The Bulgarian Monarchy.

Political career 

Nikolov first ran for parliament in 2009, leading the list of DSB in Lovech. Although he didn't become an MP, his positive performance was awarded with a seat in the national committee of the party by the leader Ivan Kostov. He then quickly becomes Kostov's main spokesperson. Nikolov was the strategist behind Proshko Proshkov's campaign for mayor of Sofia in 2011. Proshkov won the internal elections in DSB and became the party nominee but subsequently couldn't defeat the sitting mayor. Due to internal conflicts Nikolov and Proshkov left the party together with Daniel Mitov and Hristo Angelichin (future minister and deputy minister of foreign affairs). They all joined Meglena Kuneva's party Bulgaria for Citizens Movement (BCM) in 2012. With BCM in 2013 Nikolov ran another unsuccessful MP campaign.

In 2014 Petar Nikolov founded the Institute for Right-Wing Policy which aimed to promote and facilitate the coalition between GERB and the Reformist Bloc. After the coalition came into being, Nikolov was appointed parliamentary secretary of the Council of Ministers by PM Boyko Borissov.

Nikolov delivered a surprise in 2017, announcing that he's going to run for parliament from the list of United Patriots. Although he performed well above his party's average result, he still couldn't make it into the National assembly.  Initially, during the formation of the coalition between GERB and the United Patriots, his candidacy was promoted to the post of culture minister, but then Petar Nikolov was appointed for Deputy Minister of Education and Science.

Publications 
Petar Nikolov-Zikov is an author of dozens of scientific articles. His monographs:

Honours

 - Commander, pro Merito Melitensi (2019)

References 

1979 births
Living people
21st-century Bulgarian historians
Sofia University alumni
Politicians from Sofia
Bulgarian conservatives
Academic staff of New Bulgarian University
Recipients of the Order pro Merito Melitensi